Voxtalisib (XL-765, SAR245409) is a drug which acts as a dual inhibitor of the kinase enzymes phosphatidylinositol 3-kinase (PI3K) and mechanistic target of rapamycin (mTOR). It is in clinical trials for the treatment of various types of cancer.

References 

Phosphoinositide 3-kinase inhibitors
Experimental cancer drugs